In the theory of differential forms, a differential ideal I is an algebraic ideal in the ring of smooth differential forms on a smooth manifold, in other words a graded ideal in the sense of ring theory, that is further closed under exterior differentiation d, meaning that for any form α in I, the exterior derivative dα is also in I.

In the theory of differential algebra, a differential ideal I in a differential ring R is an ideal which is mapped to itself by each differential operator.

Exterior differential systems and partial differential equations 
An exterior differential system consists of a smooth manifold  and a differential ideal

.

One can express any partial differential equation system as an exterior differential system with independence condition. Suppose that we have a kth order partial differential equation system for maps , given by

.

The graph of the -jet  of any solution of this partial differential equation system is a submanifold  of the jet space, and is an integral manifold of the contact system on the -jet bundle.

This idea allows one to analyze the properties of partial differential equations with methods of differential geometry. For instance, we can apply the Cartan–Kähler_theorem to a system of partial differential equations by writing down the associated exterior differential system. We can frequently apply Cartan's equivalence method to exterior differential systems to study their symmetries and their diffeomorphism invariants.

Perfect differential ideals 

References 
Robert Bryant, Phillip Griffiths and Lucas Hsu, Toward a geometry of differential equations(DVI file), in Geometry, Topology, & Physics, Conf. Proc. Lecture Notes Geom. Topology, edited by S.-T. Yau, vol. IV (1995), pp. 1–76, Internat. Press, Cambridge, MA
Robert Bryant, Shiing-Shen Chern, Robert Gardner, Phillip Griffiths, Hubert Goldschmidt, Exterior Differential Systems, Springer--Verlag, Heidelberg, 1991.
Thomas A. Ivey, J. M. Landsberg, Cartan for beginners. Differential geometry via moving frames and exterior differential systems. Second edition. Graduate Studies in Mathematics, 175. American Mathematical Society, Providence, RI, 2016.
H. W. Raudenbush, Jr.  "Ideal Theory and Algebraic Differential Equations", Transactions of the American Mathematical Society, Vol. 36, No. 2. (Apr., 1934), pp. 361–368. Stable URL:    
J. F. Ritt, Differential Algebra, Dover, New York, 1950.

Differential forms
Differential algebra
Differential systems